Anna Gianelli Yap de Belen-Rivera, more commonly known as Gelli de Belen, is a Filipino actress and television host.

She is known for her role as a host of SiS, a daytime television program that ran on GMA Network from 2001 to 2010.

Early life
The younger sister of actress and television presenter Janice de Belen, she began her career in show business at the age of 8. Her mother was heavily involved in her early career (where she was often included on set for tapings and shootings), and as a result, her reputation developed alongside Gelli De Belen's career.

Personal life
De Belen married Filipino recording artist and actor Ariel Rivera in 1997. Together they have two children: Joaquín Andrés (born January 29, 1999) and Julio Alessandro (born November 6, 2000).

On March 19, 2016, her mother Susan de Belen died of cardiac arrest at the age of 67. In an interview with the Philippine Entertainment Portal, Gelli De Belen expressed how she felt, saying “I mean, of course, it hurts. My mom was only sixty-seven. [...] But at some point, it's not your decision, it's not your call anymore."

As of 2019, Gelli De Belen and her immediate family currently reside primarily in Canada.

Awards
Her role in the film Gagay: Prinsesa ng brownout earned her a nomination for Best Actress at the 1993 Manila Film Festival. In 1995, De Belen won the Gawad Urian Award for Best Actress for her portrayal of Sarah Jane Salazar in the movie The Secrets of Sarah Jane: Sana'y Mapatawad Mo, a biographical film about AIDS activist Sarah Jane Salazar.

Filmography

Film

Television

Discography
Gelli (Viva Records, 1991)

References

External links

1973 births
Living people
ABS-CBN personalities
Actresses from Metro Manila
Filipino child actresses
Filipino women comedians
Filipino film actresses
Filipino people of Chinese descent
GMA Network personalities
People from Quezon City
TV5 (Philippine TV network) personalities